Mark Blicavs (born 28 March 1991) is a professional Australian rules footballer for the Geelong Football Club in the Australian Football League (AFL). He made his debut for the club in round one of the 2013 AFL season.

Early life
Blicavs' parents were both born overseas – his father was born in New Zealand to Latvian parents, and his mother was born on the isle of Jersey. Both of his parents represented Australia at basketball.  His father Andris Blicavs played at the 1976 Montreal Olympics and his mother Karen Ogden was a member of the team that competed at the 1983 World Championships.  His brother Kris has played basketball in the South East Australian Basketball League (SEABL) and his sister Sara Blicavs played in the Women's National Basketball League (WNBL).

Prior to being recruited by Geelong, Blicavs was a middle-distance runner and steeplechaser, who attempted to qualify for the 2012 Summer Olympics.

Football career
Blicavs was recruited by Geelong with draft pick #54 in the 2012 Rookie Draft. He made his debut in Round 1, 2013, against  at the Melbourne Cricket Ground. In 2015, Blicavs won the Carji Greeves Medal as Geelong's best and fairest player.

Statistics
Updated to the end of the 2022 season.

|- 
| 2013 ||  || 46
| 22 || 7 || 8 || 96 || 143 || 239 || 63 || 69 || 238 || 0.3 || 0.4 || 4.4 || 6.5 || 10.9 || 2.9 || 3.1 || 10.8 || 0
|-
| 2014 ||  || 46
| 23 || 5 || 4 || 142 || 135 || 277 || 92 || 76 || 197 || 0.2 || 0.2 || 6.2 || 5.9 || 12.0 || 4.0 || 3.3 || 8.6 || 0
|- 
| 2015 ||  || 46
| 21 || 4 || 6 || 156 || 226 || 382 || 96 || 126 || 343 || 0.2 || 0.3 || 7.4 || 10.8 || 18.1 || 4.6 || 6.0 || 16.3 || 4
|-
| 2016 ||  || 46
| 24 || 7 || 7 || 170 || 257 || 427 || 100 || 139 || 195 || 0.3 || 0.3 || 7.1 || 10.7 || 17.8 || 4.2 || 5.8 || 8.1 || 1
|- 
| 2017 ||  || 46
| 20 || 12 || 5 || 148 || 176 || 324 || 82 || 102 || 121 || 0.6 || 0.3 || 7.4 || 8.8 || 16.2 || 4.1 || 5.1 || 6.1 || 1
|-
| 2018 ||  || 46
| 23 || 1 || 3 || 153 || 182 || 335 || 91 || 76 || 79 || 0.0 || 0.1 || 6.7 || 7.9 || 14.6 || 4.0 || 3.3 || 3.4 || 0
|- 
| 2019 ||  || 46
| 25 || 0 || 3 || 182 || 154 || 336 || 124 || 90 || 91 || 0.0 || 0.1 || 7.3 || 6.2 || 13.4 || 5.0 || 3.6 || 3.6 || 0
|-
| 2020 ||  || 46
| 21 || 3 || 1 || 132 || 131 || 263 || 70 || 59 || 181 || 0.1 || 0.0 || 6.3 || 6.2 || 12.5 || 3.3 || 2.8 || 8.6 || 0
|- 
| 2021 ||  || 46
| 24 || 5 || 0 || 164 || 166 || 330 || 94 || 67 || 283 || 0.2 || 0.0 || 6.8 || 6.9 || 13.8 || 3.9 || 2.8 || 11.8 || 0
|-
| scope=row bgcolor=F0E68C | 2022# ||  || 46
| 24 || 8 || 5 || 186 || 239 || 425 || 97 || 121 || 350 || 0.3 || 0.2 || 7.8 || 10.0 || 17.7 || 4.0 || 5.0 || 14.6 || 9
|- class=sortbottom
! colspan=3 | Career
! 227 !! 52 !! 42 !! 1529 !! 1809 !! 3338 !! 909 !! 925 !! 2078 !! 0.2 !! 0.2 !! 6.7 !! 8.0 !! 14.7 !! 4.0 !! 4.1 !! 9.2 !! 15
|}

Notes

Honours and achievements
Team
 AFL premiership player: 2022
 2× McClelland Trophy: 2019, 2022

Individual
 2× Carji Greeves Medal: 2015, 2018
 All-Australian team: 2022
Victorian Representative Honours in Bushfire Relief Match: 2020
 Geelong F.C. Best Young Player Award: 2013
 Geelong F.C. Tom Harley Award for Best Clubman: 2020

See also
 Blicavs

References

External links

Athletics Australia results

1991 births
Living people
Geelong Football Club players
Geelong Football Club Premiership players
Australian rules footballers from Victoria (Australia)
Australian male middle-distance runners
Australian male steeplechase runners
Australian people of Jersey descent
Australian people of Latvian descent
Carji Greeves Medal winners
One-time VFL/AFL Premiership players
University of Victoria alumni
People from Sunbury, Victoria